Zebil Island is the rocky island off the northwest coast of Low Island in the South Shetland Islands extending 510 m in east-southeast to west-northwest direction and 340 m wide.

The feature is named after the settlement of Zebil in Northeastern Bulgaria.

Location
Zebil Island is located 440 m southwest of Cape Wallace and 1.3 km north-northeast of Fernandez Point.  British mapping in 2009.

Maps

 South Shetland Islands: Smith and Low Islands. Scale 1:150000 topographic map No. 13677. British Antarctic Survey, 2009
 Antarctic Digital Database (ADD). Scale 1:250000 topographic map of Antarctica. Scientific Committee on Antarctic Research (SCAR). Since 1993, regularly upgraded and updated

References
 Zebil Island. SCAR Composite Antarctic Gazetteer.
 Bulgarian Antarctic Gazetteer. Antarctic Place-names Commission. (details in Bulgarian, basic data in English)

External links
 Zebil Island. Adjusted Copernix satellite image

Islands of the South Shetland Islands
Bulgaria and the Antarctic